Figeholm is a locality situated in Oskarshamn Municipality, Kalmar County, Sweden with 743 inhabitants in 2010.

References

External links 

Populated places in Kalmar County
Populated places in Oskarshamn Municipality
Market towns in Sweden